Zülfikar İnönü Tümer (born 1966) is a Turkish politician from the Republican People's Party (CHP), who has served as a Member of Parliament for Adana since 7 June 2015.

Tümer graduated from Istanbul Technical University as a construction engineer and founded his own construction company shortly afterwards. He worked as an engineer for the construction of roads and bridges, as well as property restoration projects. He is the son of former CHP MP Emin Bilen Tümer, who served as an MP between 1973 and 1977. He was elected as a CHP Member of Parliament in the June 2015 general election.

See also
25th Parliament of Turkey

References

External links
 Collection of all relevant news items at Haberler.com
 Collection of all relevant news items at Son Dakika

Contemporary Republican People's Party (Turkey) politicians
Deputies of Adana
Members of the 25th Parliament of Turkey
Living people
People from Adana
1966 births
Place of birth missing (living people)
Members of the 26th Parliament of Turkey